Marjolein Bastin (née uit den Bogaard) (born 1943) is a Dutch nature artist, writer, children's author and illustrator. She is the creator of the character "Vera the Mouse".

Biography
Bastin was born in Loenen (aan de Vecht) and studied at the Academy of Arts in Arnhem, where she met her husband and manager Gaston Bastin. Her father was educator and photographer John Henri uit den Bogaard (1911-1993). They have a daughter, Sanna (born in 1973), and a son, Mischa (born in 1974). Sanna runs the "Marjolein Bastin Kadowinkel" (The Marjolein Bastin Giftshop) while Mischa is a lawyer in Kansas City, USA. Marjolein and Gaston divide their time between country homes in the Netherlands and Missouri, and a tropical retreat in the Cayman Islands. 

From 1960 to 1965, Bastin worked for different advertising agencies and publishers. Shortly after completing her studies at the Academy of Arts, she was asked to illustrate a one-page feature for the popular Dutch women's weekly Libelle. A Hallmark Cards designer discovered Bastin's artwork while on a trip to the Netherlands in the early 1990s. Stationery, greeting cards, home décor items and gifts in Hallmark's Nature's Sketchbook by Marjolein Bastin line are among the company's best-selling offerings. Many of her drawings are available as cross-stitch patterns, through Lanarte. Heye Puzzles offer Bastin's work as jigsaw puzzles.

In Good Housekeeping in 2003 she is quoted as saying, "I love the familiar and ordinary" and, "[t]he world that lies before us every day is just as beautiful as what's exotic and rare. Nature makes us all rich."

In Country Living in 2004 her garden was described as combining both formal manicured lines (e.g. topiary) along with "wild and woolly habitats" to encourage visits from a variety of different animals.

Works
 1985 – My Name Is Vera (Vera the Mouse Series)
 1985 – Vera's Special Hobbies
 1985 – Vera Dresses Up
 1985 – Vera and her Friends
 1986 – Vera the Mouse
 1988 – Games With Vera
 1988 – Vera in the Garden
 1988 – Vera in the Kitchen
 1988 – Vera in the Washtub
 1991 – Nature Diary
 1991 – A Little Dog for Vera
 1994 – Flowers A to Z
 1994 – From My Window
 1994 – Nature's Sketchbook
 1995 – Gardener's Companion
 1995 – A Walk in the Woods
 1996 – Seasons of Friendship
 1998 – Butterflies - Winged Miracles of Nature
 2004 – View From a Sketchbook: Nature Through the Eyes of Marjolein Bastin (with Tovah Martin)

In 2000 Vera starred in a 30-minute animated movie called "Vera the Mouse: Mr. Mole's Surprise".

References

External links
 Official Website
 Marjolein Bastin Artist Biography

1943 births
Living people
20th-century Dutch women artists
21st-century Dutch women artists
Dutch illustrators
Dutch children's writers
People from Loenen
Dutch women painters
Dutch women illustrators
Dutch children's book illustrators
Dutch women children's writers
Hallmark Cards artists